Amanda Stern, is an American writer and literary event organiser. Her fiction, non-fiction, and poetry have appeared in, among other places, The New York Times, The New York Times Magazine, Filmmaker, The Believer, Post Road, St. Ann's Review, Salt Hill, Hayden's Ferry Review, Five Chapters and Spinning Jenny - and her debut novel, The Long Haul , was well-received

Early work
When she was a senior in high school, Stern starred in an off-Broadway production of a play she co-wrote, at the now defunct Kaufmann Theater. From there she turned to film, working for Good Machine, Hal Hartley, Ang Lee and Terry Gilliam, and later as a comic, co-hosting the Lorne Michaels' comedy series, "This is Not a Test", alongside host, Marc Maron at Catch a Rising Star. Soon after she became an on-air host for the Lorne Michaels' owned network, Burly Bear Network. In 1999 she left comedy all together in order to pursue a career in fiction.

Events
In 2003 Stern founded the highly acclaimed and popular The Happy Ending Music and Reading Series in 2003 out of a small Chinatown bar. Cited by critics of The Village Voice, New York magazine, NY Press and The New Yorker as the best series in New York City, with Time Out New York calling it the "most vital authors' series in NYC", and "consistently one of the most entertaining literary events in the city". Stern's reputation as a skilled host and discerning curator grew, and in 2006, she was profiled in the "New York" issue of The New York Times Magazine as one of ten "New Bohemians, helping to keep downtown New York alive". The Happy Ending Series quickly became a required stop for authors and musicians on tour.

On January 7, 2009, after five years in the small bar, the well-loved series moved to uptown to NYC's premiere performance venue, Joe's Pub at the Public Theater becoming the pub's first ever ongoing literary series. She has welcomed over 600 artists, including: Laurie Anderson, Aimee Mann, James Salter, Moby, A.M. Homes, Rick Moody, Amy Hempel, Mary Gaitskill, My Brightest Diamond and Mark Eitzel.

The last event was held in May 2016.

Writing
Stern has written eleven books for children under the pseudonyms A.J. Stern and Fiona Rosenbloom. Her fiction, non-fiction, and poetry have appeared in, among other places, The New York Times, The New York Times Magazine, Filmmaker, The Believer, Post Road, St. Ann's Review, Salt Hill, Hayden's Ferry Review, Five Chapters and Spinning Jenny
Her debut novel, The Long Haul, released by Soft Skull Press can be found in bookstores nationwide.

She blogs about culture, and her series at http://www.amandastern.com. Stern has held several residencies at Yaddo and MacDowell. She currently lives in Fort Greene, Brooklyn, home to the novelists Colson Whitehead, Jennifer Egan and Jhumpa Lahiri, where she is working on her next novel.

References

Further reading 
 Amanda's blog, Lessons in Curating, Lessons in Culture
 Amanda Stern (December 30, 2001) "Seeing Etan", The New York Times Magazine
 Blake Wilson (April 15, 2005) Living With Music: A Playlist by Amanda Stern, The New York Times ArtsBeat blog
 http://www.publishersweekly.com/pw/print/20020729/22487-soft-skull-home-to-first-novels-.html

External links 

 

Year of birth missing (living people)
Living people
21st-century American novelists
American women novelists
American women poets
Impresarios
Novelists from New York (state)
21st-century American women writers
21st-century American poets
People from Fort Greene, Brooklyn